Letter to a Hero is a 1943 American short documentary film produced by Frederic Ullman Jr. It was nominated for an Academy Award at the 16th Academy Awards for Best Short Subject (Two-Reel).

References

External links
 

1943 films
1943 short films
1943 documentary films
Black-and-white documentary films
American short documentary films
American black-and-white films
1940s short documentary films
RKO Pictures short films
1940s English-language films
1940s American films